Mesake Navugona is a Fijian rugby footballer who represented Fiji at rugby league in the 2000 World Cup.

References

External links
 
 
 
 
 
 
 
 
 

Living people
Fijian rugby league players
Fijian rugby union players
Fiji national rugby league team players
Fiji international rugby union players
Rugby union wings
Rugby league administrators
I-Taukei Fijian people
Year of birth missing (living people)
Rugby articles needing expert attention